is a Japanese boxer. He competed in the men's lightweight event at the 1976 Summer Olympics. At the 1976 Summer Olympics, he lost to Howard Davis Jr. of the United States.

References

1954 births
Living people
Japanese male boxers
Olympic boxers of Japan
Boxers at the 1976 Summer Olympics
Sportspeople from Aomori Prefecture
Lightweight boxers